FER or Fer may refer to:

Grapes
 Fer, a French red-wine grape
 Gros Verdot, a French red-wine grape

Languages
 Fer language, a Nilo-Saharan language
 Kaligi language, a Ubangian language

Science
 FER (gene)
 Fer (insect), a genus of grasshopper in the Catantopina
 FERONIA, a kinase

Other
 Fer Publishing, an imprint of VDM Publishing
 County Fermanagh, Northern Ireland (Chapman code)
 Faculty of Electrical Engineering and Computing of the University of Zagreb
 Far Eastern Republic, an historical state, existing from 1920 to 1922 during the Russian Civil War
 Fernhill railway station, in Wales
 Ferrovie Emilia Romagna, an Italian transport-company
 Left Revolutionary Front (Portugal)
 New Spirit Party, a political party in Kosovo